The Columbia Symphony Orchestra was an orchestra formed by Columbia Records strictly for the purpose of making recordings. In the 1950s, it provided a vehicle for some of Columbia's better known conductors and recording artists to record using only company resources. The musicians in the orchestra were contracted as needed for individual sessions and consisted of free-lance artists and often members of either the New York Philharmonic or the Los Angeles Philharmonic, depending on whether the recording was being made in Columbia's East Coast or West Coast studios.

Early history
Some of the first recordings featuring the Columbia Symphony Orchestra were made in New York in February 1913.  Felix Weingartner made five acoustic sides in New York with the soprano Lucille Marcel (the third of his five marriages) Only one take was subsequently issued, "Ave Maria" from Verdi's Otello on Columbia US A-5482, matrix number 36622. The other unissued takes included two of Weingartner's own songs, "Vergangenheit" and "Welke Rose", Schumann's "Die Lotosblume", op. 25, no. 7 and Olga von Radecki's "Frisches Grun".

Frank Bridge made a single (unissued) take of Grieg's Shepherd Boy, op. 54 with the orchestra for Columbia UK on matrix AX 268, in London on 14 December 1923.

The composer and conductor Robert Hood Bowers made around 15 double-sided 78 rpm recordings with the orchestra in September 1927.

During a recording session in March 1932 with Weingartner and the British Symphony Orchestra in London's Westminster Central Hall, a single unissued take was made of the Waltz from Leo Delibes' ballet Naila, although the conductor is unnamed.

Howard D. Barlow (May 1, 1892 – January 31, 1972) made a recording of Deems Taylor's suite Through the Looking Glass with the Columbia Symphony Orchestra in New York in November 1938. Released on Columbia Masterworks set M-350.

Conductors
Over the decades, several noted conductors and soloists collaborated with the Columbia Symphony Orchestra including:

Alfredo Antonini

From 1941 until 1971 Alfredo Antonini also served as a principal conductor of the CBS Symphony Orchestra while collaborating with noted soloists including Richard Tucker.  In 1972 he was cited with an Emmy Award for conducting the orchestra in the television premier of Ezra Laderman's opera And David Wept.

Howard Barlow
in the later part of the 1930's, Howard Barlow joined forces with the orchestra which was known at the time as the CBS Symphony Orchestra within the Columbia Broadcasting System. Together, they recorded Deems Taylor's "Through the Looking Glass Suite", Op. 12. By 1940, they joined forces once again in a recording of Bach's Air on the G String from the Suite No. 3 for Orchestra and the Bouree from Bach's Suite No. 3 for Unaccompanied Cello. Additional recordings with the orchestra included: Franz Schubert's Symphony No. 2 in B flat major, D. 125 and selections from Engelbert Humperdinck's Hansel und Gretel Suite.

Thomas Beecham
In 1949, Sir Thomas Beecham made a series of recordings in Columbia Records' 30th Street Studios in New York City with a completely different pickup group, which was also called the Columbia Symphony Orchestra. Later reissued by Sony on CD, the recordings include Dance of the Hours from the opera La Gioconda by Amilcare Ponchielli, the overture to The Merry Wives of Windsor by Otto Nicolai, Carmen Suite by Georges Bizet, and Capriccio Italien by Peter Tchaikovsky.

Leonard Bernstein

Leonard Bernstein conducted the orchestra, and also played the piano solos, in Maurice Ravel's Piano Concerto in G and George Gershwin's Rhapsody in Blue. These were released by Columbia in stereo on LP and later reissued by Sony on CD. In addition, Bernstein also joined forces with the orchestra in collaboration with Glenn Gould in a performance of Ludwig van Beethoven's Piano Concerto No. 2 in B Flat Major, Op. 19 and Johann Sebastian Bach's Keyboard Concerto No. 1 in D Minor, BWV 1052 for Columbia Masterworks in 1957

Fausto Cleva
During his tenure at the Metropolitan Opera in 1959, Fausto Cleva led the Columbia Symphony Orchestra and the noted tenor Richard Tucker in a recording of several popular arias by Giacomo Puccini.

Robert Craft
From 1955 onwards, he made many recordings with the CSO, in CBS-projects that were intended to record the Second Viennese School for the first time integrally. In this period, Craft also produced most of the Varèse works with the Columbia Ensemble.

Vladimir Golschmann

Vladimir Golschmann also collaborated with the Columbia Symphony Orchestra in several historic recordings with the young pianist Glenn Gould. Included among their collaborations were recordings of Johann Sebastian Bach's Keyboard Concerti: No. 2, No. 3, No. 4, No. 5 & No. 7, as well as the Beethoven Piano Concerto No. 1 during the 1950's.

Alexander Schneider

Alexander Schneider paired with Rudolf Serkin and the Columbia Symphony Orchestra during the 1950's in a recording of Wolfgang Amadeus Mozart's: Piano Concerto No. 21 in C major, K. 467 and Piano Concerto No. 27 in  B flat major, K. 595.

Igor Stravinsky
Igor Stravinsky made many recordings of his own compositions with an incarnation of this orchestra, mainly musicians from the Los Angeles Festival Orchestra founded by Franz Waxman. Among the works in which Stravinsky conducted the orchestra are Apollon musagète; Le baiser de la fée; The Firebird – suite and complete ballet; Mass; Mavra; Les noces; Orpheus; Perséphone; Petrushka – suite and complete ballet; Pulcinella – suite and complete ballet; The Rake's Progress; The Rite of Spring; the Symphony in E flat; the Symphony in Three Movements and the Violin Concerto; as well as several shorter pieces.

In 1977, a recording of the Columbia Symphony Orchestra playing the "Sacrificial Dance" from The Rite of Spring, conducted by Stravinsky, was selected by NASA to be included on the Voyager Golden Record, a gold-plated copper record that was sent into space on the Voyager space craft. The record contained sounds and images which had been selected as examples of the diversity of life and culture on Earth.

George Szell

In the 1960's George Szell also joined forces with the Columbia Symphony Orchestra and Robert Casadesus for a recording of several piano concertos by Wolfgang Amadeus Mozart including: Concerto No. 22 in E flat major, K. 482 and Concerto No. 23 in A major, K. 488 for Columbia Masterworks (ML5594, 1960).

Bruno Walter
Perhaps the most important recordings the orchestra made were with conductor Bruno Walter, who recorded highly regarded interpretations of Beethoven, Brahms, Bruckner, Mahler and Mozart symphonies. With this orchestra, Walter made his only stereo recording of Mahler's Symphony No. 9, which he had conducted at its world premiere.

Other recordings
The term Columbia Symphony Orchestra was also used when, for contractual reasons, another orchestra could not appear under its own name.  Many Los Angeles Philharmonic musicians also played under the Columbia Symphony name, and some reports mention that the entire Philharmonic frequently played as the Columbia Symphony when recorded on the west coast.

CBS Symphony Orchestra
There was also the Columbia Broadcasting Symphony Orchestra, sometimes called the CBS Symphony Orchestra. This group was formed to perform on CBS Radio broadcasts and also made 78-rpm recordings for Columbia Records during the 1940s. It was frequently conducted by Howard Barlow, who later became the music director of "The Voice of Firestone" radio and television programs.  One of the Columbia Records releases by the CBS Symphony with Barlow conducting was the "Indian Suites" by Edward MacDowell, recorded on May 15, 1939; this recording can be heard on YouTube.  The composer Bernard Herrmann conducted the orchestra for some broadcasts, especially The Mercury Theatre on the Air and The Campbell Playhouse programs presented by Orson Welles.

References

Notes

Citations

External links
 Discography of American Historical Recordings: University of California Santa Barbara - Audio recordings online of the Columbia Symphony Orchestra archived at the University of California Santa Barbara
  Audio recordings by the Columbia Symphony Orchestra on archive.org
 Audio recordings by the Columbia Broadcasting Symphony on archive.org
 Audio recordings by the CBS Symphony Orchestra conducted by Alfredo Antonini archived at the New York Public Library for the Performing Arts on nypl.org.

Disbanded American orchestras
CBS Radio